Jay Rosenblatt (born 1955) is an American experimental documentary filmmaker known for his work in the field of collage film since 1980.

Themes
His films explore human emotional, personal and psychological cores (e.g.: the private lives of Hitler and Stalin in Human Remains, growing up male in The Smell of Burning Ants).

Filmography
The Smell of Burning Ants (1994)
Human Remains (1998)
Nine Lives: The Eternal Moment of Now (2001)Worm (2001)Prayer (2002)Phantom Limb (2005)Afraid So (2006)I Just Wanted to Be Somebody (2006)The Darkness of Day (2009)The D Train (2011)When We Were Bullies (2021)How Do You Measure a Year? (2022)
Sources:Five Short Films by Jay Rosenblatt|KanopyTwo Films By Jay Rosenblatt - Roxie TheaterJay Rosenblatt Films at the Museum of Modern Art - The New York Times

Accolades
Sundance Jury Award for Human Remains94th Academy Awards: Academy Award for Best Documentary (Short Subject) – nomination for When We Were Bullies2022|Oscars.org
95th Academy Awards: Academy Award for Best Documentary (Short Subject) – nomination for How Do You Measure a Year?''

References

External links
Jay Rosenblatt on IMDb
Official website
Official YouTube channel

Collage filmmakers
American documentary filmmakers
American experimental filmmakers
1955 births
Jewish American artists
Living people